Qualicum National Wildlife Area is a National Wildlife Area located on Vancouver Island in British Columbia, Canada. The national wildlife area was established in 1977 by the Canadian Wildlife Service to protect critical habitat for migratory birds in the Nanaimo Lowland.

Overview
The national wildlife area consists of three small units - Rosewall Creek, Marshall-Stevenson, and Nanoose Bay - spread out along the northeastern coast Vancouver Island between the communities of Fanny Bay and Nanoose Bay.

See also
List of National Wildlife Areas in Canada
Mount Arrowsmith Biosphere Region

References

Protected areas of British Columbia
Protected areas established in 1977
1977 establishments in British Columbia
National Wildlife Areas of Canada